Henry Gooch may refer to:

Henry Gooch, British politician
Sir Henry Daniel Gooch, 2nd Baronet (1841–1897) of the Gooch baronets
Henry Mansfield Gooch, Mayor of Prahran, Australia